Cotton Bowl may refer to:

 Cotton Bowl Classic, an annual college football post-season bowl game
 Cotton Bowl (stadium), American football stadium located in Fair Park, Dallas, Texas; former venue for Cotton Bowl Classic